Charaxes mars, the iron rajah, is a butterfly of the rajahs and nawabs group, i.e. the Charaxinae group of the brush-footed butterflies family. It is endemic to Sulawesi in central Indonesia. Charaxes mars is a large butterfly with forewings with concave outer edge and hindwings each with a tail. The upper side of the forewings is dark blue and light in the basal part. The hindwings are orange with a submarginal line of dark brown ocelli.

Technical description

male Tawny colour of upperside of hindwing not reaching in front of R1; black
postdisco-submarginal patches all fused together (except dots M2S-M2), patch
M1-M2 elongate, vein R3 and outer half of M1 black, tawny admarginal interspaces
SC2- R2 faintly indicated; tail shorter than in mars dohertyifemale Unknown.
madensis 
male Unknown. Most likely resembling that of Ch. mars. 

female. Allied to Ch.mars. Upperside Forewing: blackish brown, no blue tone, white discal band broader than Ch. mars.

Races
 Charaxes mars mars (northern Sulawesi)
 Charaxes mars dohertyi Rothschild, 1892 (southern Sulawesi)
 Charaxes mars madensis Rothschild, 1899 (Buru)

References

mars
Butterflies of Indonesia
Butterflies described in 1885